The Redpath Sugar Refinery is a sugar storage, refining and museum complex in Toronto, Ontario, Canada. The site is located east of Downtown Toronto, the intersection of Queens Quay and Jarvis Street.

Buildings
The complex, opened in 1958, houses the storage and refining plant of Toronto-based Redpath Sugar. The complex consists of Building 1 (8 floors), a chimney stack, and Building 2 (5 floors) houses the sugar museum. The sugar processed at the plant originates in the Caribbean and Brazil, and is delivered by ships using the Saint Lawrence Seaway. Due to the limited shipping season, sugar cane is stockpiled each fall in facilities next to the processing plant.

In 2006, the red illuminated "Redpath Sugar" sign that adorned the north side of the building was taken down and replaced with a sign (since removed) for Tate & Lyle, the owner at that time (Redpath is now owned by American Sugar Refining). The Redpath signage on the west side of the building is still intact. The north-facing wall of the Raw Sugar Shed features a whale mural by artist Wyland.

Redpath Sugar Museum
Since 1979, Redpath has operated the Redpath Sugar Museum in the building, with exhibits about the refining of sugar and making of sugar products. The museum is affiliated with the Canadian Museums Association, Canadian Heritage Information Network, and Virtual Museum of Canada.

See also 
 Harbourfront – neighbourhood in Toronto
 Peter Redpath
 Redpath Museum
 Sugar Beach
 Toronto Harbour

References

External links 
 
 Redpath Sugar Refinery and Museum – Emporis.com
 Redpath Sugar Museum – contact
 
 Redpath Sugar Museum – Ontario Museum Association

Museums in Toronto
Industrial buildings completed in 1958
Museums established in 1979
Food museums in Canada
Industry museums in Canada
Redpath family
Sugar refineries
1958 establishments in Ontario
Sugar museums